Kateh Shamshir-e Sofla (also Romanized as Kateh Shamshīr-e Soflá and Kateh Shamshīr Soflá; also known as Kateh Shamshīr and Katteh Shamshīr-e Pā’īn) is a village in Qalandarabad Rural District, Qalandarabad District, Fariman County, Razavi Khorasan Province, Iran. At the 2006 census, its population was 2,552, in 565 families.

References 

Populated places in Fariman County